Phoenicocoris carbonarius is a species of plant bugs belonging to the family Miridae, subfamily Phylinae that can be found in Romania and  Ukraine.

References

Insects described in 1888
Hemiptera of Europe
Miridae
Taxa named by Géza Horváth